Johnny Ace Watson (January 11, 1949 – July 2, 2022) was an American football offensive lineman who played nine seasons in the NFL for the San Francisco 49ers and New Orleans Saints. He played college football at the University of Oklahoma. Born in Palo Alto, California, Watson died of Alzheimer's at age 73 in Oklahoma City, Oklahoma.

References

1949 births
2022 deaths
Sportspeople from Palo Alto, California
American football offensive linemen
Oklahoma Sooners football players
San Francisco 49ers players
New Orleans Saints players